Muzio Vitali (died 1615) was a Roman Catholic prelate who served as Bishop of Vieste (1613–1615).

On 13 November 1613, Muzio Vitali was appointed during the papacy of Paul V as Bishop of Vieste.
On 17 November 1613, he was consecrated bishop by Giovanni Garzia Mellini, Cardinal-Priest of Santi Quattro Coronati with Giovanni Battista del Tufo, Bishop Emeritus of Acerra, and Antonio Seneca, Bishop of Anagni, serving as co-consecrators. 
He served as Bishop of Vieste until his death in 1615.

References

External links and additional sources
 (for Chronology of Bishops) 
 (for Chronology of Bishops)  

17th-century Italian Roman Catholic bishops
Bishops appointed by Pope Paul V
1615 deaths